Aethes rubiginana is a species of moth of the family Tortricidae. It was described by Walsingham in 1903. It is found in on Sicily and in Gibraltar, Italy, Morocco and Algeria.

The forewings are shining silvery white on the apical third and suffused with rust brown in the remaining area. The hindwings are pale grey. Adults are on wing from April to May.

The larvae feed on Ferula communis and Thapsia species.

References

rubiginana
Moths described in 1903
Moths of Europe
Moths of Africa